The 9th Infantry Division (9-ya Pekhotnaya Diviziya) was an infantry formation of the Russian Imperial Army that existed in various formations from the early 19th century until the end of World War I and the Russian Revolution. The division was based in Radom and later Poltava in the years leading up to 1914. It fought in World War I and was demobilized in 1918.

Organization 
The 9th Infantry Division was part of the 10th Army Corps.
1st Brigade (HQ Poltava)
33rd Yelets Infantry Regiment 
34th Sevsk Infantry Regiment
2nd Brigade (HQ Poltava, 1905: Kremenchug)
35th Bryansk Infantry Regiment 
36th Orel Infantry Regiment
9th Artillery Brigade.

Commanders (Division Chiefs) 
1871–1876: Fyodor Radetzky
1876–1881: Nikolay Svyatopolk-Mirsky
1903: Nikolai Zarubaev
1905: Sergei Konstantinovich Gershelman
1909: Petr Domozhirov

Commanders of the 1st Brigade
1894–1895: Mikhail Zasulich
1905: Konstantin Zhdanovsky
1909: Iosif Bonch-Bogdanovsky

Commanders of the 2nd Brigade
1905: Vladimir Shatilov
1909: Alexander Vorypaev

References 

Infantry divisions of the Russian Empire
Military units and formations disestablished in 1918
Poltava Governorate